I Am What I Am may refer to:

Albums 
 I Am What I Am (George Jones album)
 I Am What I Am (Mark Morrison EP)
 I Am What I Am (Merle Haggard album)
 I Am What I Am (Milan the Leather Boy album)
 I Am What I Am (Ruth Copeland album)
 I Am What I Am (Shirley Bassey album)
 I Am What I Am, a 1984 album by Jerry Lee Lewis

Songs 
 "I Am What I Am" (Broadway musical song), a song from La Cage aux Folles
 "I Am What I Am" (Mark Owen song)
 "I Am What I Am" (Village People song)
 "I Am What I Am" (Emma Muscat song)
 "I Am What I Am", a song by Jonas Brothers from It's About Time

See also
 "I Yam What I Yam", an early Popeye cartoon (1933), and an expression closely associated with the character
 I Am that I Am, taken from a Bible verse referring to God's name
 "I Am That I Am", a song by Peter Tosh from Equal Rights
 I Am Who I Am (disambiguation)
 Law of identity
 Col cuore in gola, a 1967 Italian film, released in the United States under the title I Am What I Am
 I Am What I Am ( 2021 film)